Rollen may refer to:

 Rollen Henry Anthis (1915–1995), United States Air Force major general
 Rollen Hans (born 1931), American retired basketball player
 Rollen Stewart (born 1944), American sports fan fixture and convicted kidnapper
 Ola Rollén, Swedish entrepreneur and CEO

See also
 Rollin (name)

English-language masculine given names